Brenda Shaughnessy (born 1970) is an American poet.

Life
Shaughnessy was born in Okinawa and grew up in Southern California. She received her BA in literature and women's studies at the University of California, Santa Cruz and MFA at Columbia University.

Her poems have appeared in Best American Poetry, BOMB, Conjunctions, McSweeney’s, The New Yorker, The Paris Review, The Yale Review, and elsewhere. Our Andromeda (2012) was selected as a Library Journal "Book of the Year" and as one of the "100 Best Books of 2013" by The New York Times as well as being shortlisted for both the 2013 PEN/Open Book Award and the 2013 International Griffin Poetry Prize.  So Much Synth, was published in 2016 by Copper Canyon Press.  Her fifth book of poems, The Octopus Museum, was published by Knopf in 2019.

She is Associate Professor of English in the MFA Program at Rutgers–Newark.  She lives in Verona, New Jersey with her husband, the poet and editor Craig Morgan Teicher, and their children.

Awards
 2018 Literature Award from the American Academy of Arts and Letters. 
Our Andromeda, shortlisted for the 2013 International Griffin Poetry Prize and the 2013 PEN/Open Book Award.
 Human Dark with Sugar, winner of the James Laughlin Award from the Academy of American Poets, finalist for National Book Critics Circle award
 Interior with Sudden Joy, which was nominated for the PEN/Joyce Osterweil Award for Poetry, a Lambda Literary Award, and the Norma Farber First Book Award.
 Bunting Fellowship at the Radcliffe Institute for Advanced Study at Harvard University
 Japan/U.S. Friendship Commission Artist Fellowship.

Bibliography

Poetry 
Collections
 
 
 
 
 
Anthologies

 
 
 
 
 
List of poems

 
 
 
 
 
 "Epithalament", Fort.org

References

1970 births
Living people
21st-century American poets
21st-century American women writers
American people of Okinawan descent
American poets of Asian descent
American women writers of Asian descent
American poets
American women academics
American women poets
American writers of Japanese descent
Columbia University School of the Arts alumni
The New Yorker people
People from Okinawa Island
People from Verona, New Jersey
Princeton University faculty
Radcliffe fellows
University of California, Santa Cruz alumni